John Henry is a former American football coach.

Henry's National Football League (NFL) coaching career began with the Pittsburgh Steelers during Chuck Noll's final two season as head coach (1990–91). Henry then moved on to coach at the University of Pittsburgh (1993–1995) and with the Detroit Lions (1997–1999). While in Detroit, his offensive line helped Barry Sanders to rush for over 2,000 yards.  Following Detroit, he went with Jim Haslett to coach the offensive line for the New Orleans Saints.  During his time in New Orleans, the Saints won a playoff game for the first time in franchise history and had a 1,000 yard rusher for five consecutive years, also a franchise first.  He was named assistant head coach and run game coordinator in his later years with the club.  Prior to his NFL career, Henry was a college coach for 21 years with stops at West Virginia University, Wake Forest University, and Indiana University of Pennsylvania (IUP), his alma mater.  Henry also coached for three years on the high school level. He is a graduate of Chartiers Houston High School in Houston, Pennsylvania and IUP.  He holds an MS degree from West Virginia University.  

After a disappointing playoff loss to the Pittsburgh Steelers, the San Diego Chargers organization announced that Henry's contract would not be renewed when it expired in February 2009.  During the 2006 season Henry's line cleared the way for LaDainian Tomlinson to lead the NFL in rushing as well as setting a new NFL record for touchdowns with 31. 

Henry has retired and settled in Greensburg, Pennsylvania.

References

External links
 San Diego Chargers profile 

Year of birth missing (living people)
Living people
American football offensive guards
Appalachian State Mountaineers football coaches
Detroit Lions coaches
Edinboro Fighting Scots football coaches
IUP Crimson Hawks football coaches
IUP Crimson Hawks football players
Millersville Marauders football coaches
New Orleans Saints coaches
Pittsburgh Panthers football coaches
Pittsburgh Steelers coaches
San Diego Chargers coaches
Southern Illinois Salukis football coaches
Wake Forest Demon Deacons football coaches
West Virginia Mountaineers football coaches
High school football coaches in Pennsylvania
West Virginia University alumni
People from Washington County, Pennsylvania
Players of American football from Pennsylvania